The Western Hemisphere is the half of the planet Earth that lies west of the Prime Meridian (which crosses Greenwich, London, England) and east of the 180th meridian. The other half is called the Eastern Hemisphere. Politically, the term Western Hemisphere is often used as a metonymy for the Americas, even though geographically the hemisphere also includes parts of other continents.

Geography
The Western Hemisphere consists of the Americas, excluding some of the Aleutian Islands to the southwest of the Alaskan mainland; the westernmost portion of Europe, both mainland and islands; the westernmost portion of Africa, both mainland and islands; the extreme eastern tip of the Russian mainland and islands (North Asia); numerous territories in Oceania; and a large portion of Antarctica.

The center of the Western Hemisphere is located in the Pacific Ocean at the intersection of the 90th meridian west and the Equator, among the Galápagos Islands.

Alternative definitions
In an attempt to match the Western Hemisphere more closely with the Americas, some sources use the 20th meridian west and the diametrically opposed 160th meridian east to define the hemisphere. This definition excludes all of the European and African mainlands, but still includes some islands associated with these continents, more of eastern Russia and Oceania, and part of Antarctica. It includes all islands of Alaska, but excludes a small portion of northeast Greenland. There is no hemisphere that includes all of the Americas while excluding all land outside of it, regardless of the meridians or points chosen to define it.

Sovereign states in both hemispheres 
Below is a list of the sovereign states in both the Western and Eastern hemispheres on the IERS Reference Meridian, in order from north to south:

  Denmark, due to the entirety of Greenland and the Faroe Islands. Denmark proper lies entirely within the Eastern Hemisphere.
  Norway, due only to Jan Mayen. Mainland Norway, Svalbard and Bouvet Island lie entirely within the Eastern Hemisphere.
  United Kingdom, passing through Greenwich, London. Most of the country lies within the Western Hemisphere.
  The Netherlands has overseas islands that lie entirely within the Western Hemisphere, while mainland Netherlands lies entirely within the Eastern Hemisphere.

  France, passing through Puynormand (Gironde). About 1/3 of the country, including cities like Nantes or Bordeaux, as well as the overseas regions of Guadeloupe, Martinique, and French Guiana lie within the Western Hemisphere.
  Spain, passing through Castellón de la Plana (Valencian Community). Most of Spain, including the capital Madrid, the Canary Islands and the southern half of its Mediterranean territorial waters, lies within the Western Hemisphere. Spanish, Moroccan and Algerian Mediterranean waters are the only part of the Mediterranean Sea located in the Western Hemisphere.
  Algeria, passing through Stidia. About 1/4 of the country, including Oran, Algeria's second-largest city, lies within the Western Hemisphere.
  Mali, passing through the municipal area of Gao. Most of Mali, including the capital Bamako, lies within the Western Hemisphere.
  Burkina Faso, passing through Lalgaye. Most of the country, including the capital Ouagadougou, lies within the Western Hemisphere.
  Ghana, passing through Tema. Most of Ghana, including the capital Accra, lies within the Western Hemisphere.
  Togo, passing near Tami (Tône Prefecture in Savanes Region).

Below is a list of additional sovereign states which are in both the Western and Eastern hemispheres along the 180th meridian, in order from north to south. (France is not listed below due to its inclusion above, though the meridian does pass Wallis and Futuna.) With the exception of the United States (due to Wake Island, Guam and the Northern Mariana Islands), all of them are located on just one side of the International Date Line, which curves around them.

  Russia, passing through Chukotka Autonomous Okrug. Its portion lying east of the 180th meridian is the only part of the country lying in the Western Hemisphere.
  United States, passing through the Aleutian Islands (Alaska). Except for the portion of Aleutian Islands and waters lying west of the 180th meridian, Guam, the Northern Mariana Islands, and Wake Island, most of the country lies east of the 180th meridian.
  Kiribati, passing close to Arorae. The country has both the Equator and the 180th meridian (antimeridian) crossing through its territory. It is the only country located in four hemispheres.
  Tuvalu, passing close to its capital, Funafuti.
  Fiji, passing close to its dependency Rotuma and passing through Taveuni.
  Most of New Zealand proper lies within the Eastern Hemisphere; but Chatham Islands and Kermadec Islands, as well as the self-governing states of the Cook Islands and Niue and the dependent territory of Tokelau, lie east of the 180th meridian.

Countries, dependencies and other territories in the Western Hemisphere but not in the Americas 
The following countries and territories lie outside the Americas yet are entirely, mostly, or partially within the Western Hemisphere:

See also
 Land and water hemispheres
 Western world

References

External links
 

 
Hemispheres of Earth